Virginie Lemoine (born 26 February 1961) is a French actress and comedian. By her marriage with actor Alexandre Bonstein, she also has Swiss nationality.

Career
Virginie Lemoine attended acting school at the Conservatory in Rouen. From 1982 to 1990, she played theater on stage, and regularly participated in the show Ainsi font font font, hosted by Jacques Martin on France 2. In 1991, she became a radio host in the show C'est aussi bien à l'ombre and Le Vrai Faux Journal. In 1992, Laurent Gerra and Lemoine Virginie became a comedy duo and appeared in many television shows and became very popular.

From 2001 to 2016, she played the leading role of the TV series Famille d'accueil, broadcast on France 3.

Filmography

Theater
 1999 : Mariages et conséquences, by Alan Ayckbourn, Théâtre de la Renaissance
 2006 : Si c'était à refaire, by Laurent Ruquier, Théâtre de la Renaissance
 2009 : Tout le plaisir est pour nous de Ray Cooney

References

1961 births
Living people
French stage actresses
French humorists
People from Suresnes
French film actresses
Women humorists